Bernardo Gómez Martinez (born 1967) is the executive vice president of Grupo Televisa. He oversaw the news department. Gómez is also in charge of government relations.

Until recently, Gómez was president of the Mexican National Chamber of Radio and Television Industry.

References

External links
Executive Has Firm Grip on Mexico's Top Broadcaster
Libro de Ahumada: Bernardo Gómez, de Televisa, sabía todo

Mexican businesspeople
Mexican television executives
1968 births
Living people
Televisa people